The following is a list of indoor arenas in Russia with capacity of at least 4,000 spectators. Most of the arenas in this list are for multi use proposes such as individual sports, team sports as well as cultural and political events.

Currently in use

Historic Arenas

Under construction

Under proposition

See also 
List of football stadiums in Russia
List of indoor arenas by capacity

References 

 
Russia
Indoor arenas